List of all Shevchenko National Prize laureates ordered by year of reception including the Soviet period.

1960s

1962

1963

1964

1965

1966

1967

1968

1969

1970s

1970 

 Volodymyr Kanivets (novel Ulyanovs)
 Mykola Nahnybida (composition of poems The features of one face in the collection "On the battlefield")
 Oleksii Shovkunenko (series of portraits: poet Rylsky, Major-General Kovpak, and female-partisan Vovchik)
 Serhiy Smeyan (director) and Kostiantyn Parakonyev (featured actor) (play Yaroslav the Wise at the Zaporizhia Music and Drama Theater)
 Yuri Zbanatsky (novel Waves)

1971 

  (director), Volodymyr Dalsky (featured actor), Oleksandr Korniychuk (author of the play), Polina Kumanchenko (featured actress), Yevhen Ponomarenko (featured actor), Yulia Tkachenko (featured actress), Maykhailo Zadniprovsky (featured actor) (play Memory of heart at the Kiev Drama Theater)
 Vasyl Kozachenko (composition of stories Price of life, Hot hands, Thunderbolt, Letters from a cartridge, Arinka Kalinovska, White stain)
 Timofiy Levchuk (director), Oleksandr Hai (featured actor), Oleksandr Levada (script writer) (featured film Family of Kotsiubynsky)
 Yevhenia Marynchenko and Petro Zhylytsky (project the palace of culture "Ukraine" in Kiev)
 Dmitriy Smolich (director), Borys Liatoshynsky (composer), Yevhen Lysik (artistic-director), Yuri Lutsiv (conductor-director) (opera Golden Hoop at the Lviv State Academic Theater of Opera and Ballet in the name of Ivan Franko)

1972 

 Kostiantyn Filatov (pictures V.I.Lenin, Red Square)
 Mykola Hlushchenko (series of picturesque works Following Lenin's places abroad, Landscapes of Ukraine)
 Mykola Kondratiuk (concert programs 1969-1971)
 Yevhenia Miroshnychenko (performance 1970-1971)
 Diana Petrynenko (concert programs 1969-1971)
 Myron Vendzilovych (architect), Dmytro Krvavych (sculptor), Emmanuil Misko (sculptor), Yaroslav Motyka (sculptor), Oleksandr Pirozhkov (artist-monumentalist) (monument the Battle of Glory of the Soviet forces in Lviv)
 Platon Voronko (collection of poems Flooding)

1973 

 Dmytro Hnatiuk (performance 1971-1972)
 Heorhiy Holovchenko (architect), Ivan Minko (architect), Anatoliy Yehorov (architect), Ivan Chumak (sculptor), Vasyl Fedchenko (sculptor), Viktor Mukhin (sculptor), Ilya Ovcharenko (sculptor) (monument Ukraine for liberators in the village of Milove Voroshylovhrad Oblast)
 Kostiantyn Hordiyenko (trilogy [She] was harvesting the field of others, The girl under an apple-tree, Buymir)
 Oleksandr Kosinov (director), Ihor Pysanko (camera), Mykhailo Tkach (script writer) (documentary film Soviet Ukraine)
 Borys Romanytsky (performing role of Grasa in the play of M.Kulish Maklena Grasa at the Lviv State Academic Ukrainian Drama Theater in the name of M.Zankovetska, the outstanding contribution in the development of the Ukrainian theatrical art)
 Nikolay Ushakov (collection of poems My eyes, I am not afraid of verbal rhyme and long term fruitful activity in the field of translation of the Ukrainian literature)

1974 

 Mykhailo Bozhy (pictures V.I.Lenin, XX century, New time)
 Anatoliy Ihnashchenko (architect) and Halyna Kalchenko (sculptor) (monument of Lesia Ukrainka in Kiev)
 Andriy Shtoharenko (symphony #3 (Kievan))
 Pavlo Zahrebelnyi (novels Pervomost, Death in Kiev)

1975 

 Oleksandr Bilash (composer)
 Maya Holenko (bandurist), Tamara Hrytsenko (bandurist), Nina Pysarenko (bandurist) (concert programs 1973-1974)
 Valeriy Isakov (director), Vladimir Belyayev (script writer), Vladislav Dvorzhetsky (featured actor), Valeria Zaklunnaya (featured actress) (featured film To the last minute)
 Oleksandr Kovaliov (sculpture portraits of his contemporaries (Korotchenko, Rylsky, Filatov))
 Vadym Sobko (novel Lykhobor)

1976 

 Danyla, Maria, and Nina Boikos (singers) (concert programs 1973-1975)
 Ivan Drach (collection of poetry Roots and Crone)
 Viktor Puzyrkov (pictures Soldiers, In a Dugout)
 Ihor Shamo (composer), Dmytro Lutsenko (author of lyrics) (songs Ballad of Brotherhood, My Kiev, There stands over the Volga a hill, The captivated Desna, Song of Happiness, Do not make a noise, the cranberry, Front-line soldiers)
 Dmitri Shostakovich (composer), Yevdokia Kolesnyk (featured actress), Konstantin Simeonov (conductor-director), Lev Venedyktov (choreograph), Oleksandr Zahrebelny (featured actor) (opera Kateryna Izmaylova at the State Academic Theater of Opera and Ballet of Ukraine in the name of T.Shevchenko)

1977 

  (architect), Anatoliy Maksymenko (architect), Mykhailo Ovsiakin (architect), Serhiy Svetlorusov (architect), Eryk Cherkasov (architect),  (sculptor), Yakov Ryk (sculptor) (monument commemorating the declaration of the Soviet government in Ukraine (Kharkiv))
 Anatoliy Bazhenov (violin), Leontiy Krasnoshchok (cello), Borys Skvortsov (violin), Yuri Kholodov (alto) (concert programs of the string quartet named after Lysenko 1974-1976)
 Leonid Bykov (setting and performance of leading roles in featured films "Into battle only the `old-timers` go", "Aty-Baty, soldiers chanted...")
 Oleksiy Kolomiyets (drama dialogue Blue Deers and Kravtsov)
 Dmytro Pavlychko (collection of poetry Love and Hatred)
 Yevhen Stankovych (symphony #3 (I'm being affirmed))

1978 

 Kostiantyn Dankevych (composer), Anatoliy Arefyev (artistic director), Anatoliy Danshyn (leading role), Vasyl Kiose (chorus master), Nonna Surzhyna (leading role), Mykola Ukrainsky (leading role), Petro Varyvoda (conductor-director) (opera Bohdan Khmelnytsky at the Dnipropetrovsk State Theater of Opera and Ballet)
 Saniya Afzametdinova (architect), Ernest Bykov (architect), Vitaliy Yudin (architect) (creation of the Crimea Oblast Music and Drama Theater in Simferopol)
 Valentyn Borysenko (sculptor) (monument to the soldiers of the 1st Cavalry Army in the town of Olesko, Lviv Oblast)
 Ihor Hrabovsky (script writer and director), Volodymyr Shevchenko (director), Ihor Malyshevsky (script and diction texts writer) (documentary cinema-trilogy Soviet Ukraine. Years of struggle and victories.)
 Serhiy Danchenko (director), Nadiya Dotsenko (leading role), Myron Kipriyan (artistic director), Volodymyr Maksymenko (leading role), Fedir Stryhun (leading role), Mykola Zarudny (play author) (play Rear at the Lviv State Academic Ukrainian Drama theater in the name of M.Zankovetska)
 Vasyl Zemlyak (novels Swan flock and Green Mills)
 Heorhiy Cherniavsky (series of picturesque works At Lenin's places, Ulyanovs in Ukraine, and series of industrial landscape portraits of Ukraine)
 Mykola Shamota (monograph Humanism and Socialist realism)

1979 

 Volodymyr Zuyev (architect and author of the complex reconstruction), Ahrypina Vatchenko (architect), Mykola But (diorama author Battle for Dnieper), Volodymyr Korotkov (museum interior author), Mykola Oviechkin (diorama author Battle for Dnieper), Vitaliy Prokuda (diorama scientific concept author Battle for Dnieper), Volodymyr Ryvin (museum interior author) (complex of the Dnipropetrovsk Historical Museum in the name of D.Yavornytsky)
 Vasyl Hnezdilov (architect), Yevdokia Smirnova (architect), Heorhiy Ursaty (architect) (complex of the 50th Anniversary of the Grand October landscape park in Cherkasy)
 Volodymyr Denysenko (director) (featured film Reapers)
 Liubomyr Dmyterko (collection of poetry World of mine and Base)
 Anatoliy Mokrenko (singer) (concert performance 1977-1978)
 Pavlo Muravsky (chorus conductor) (concert programs by works of Leontovych 1977-1978)
 Mykola Podolian (publicist articles and pamphlets in periodicals 1976-1978)
 Yevhen Shabliovsky (monograph Chernyshevsky and Ukraine)

1980s

1980 

 Viacheslav Tikhonov (anchorman), Vladimir Barsuk (script writer), Aleksandr Buzilevich (camera), Viktor Kushch (camera), Albert Putintsev (script writer) (publicist documentary featured film Revival by the book of L.Brezhnev)
 Yevhen Kyryliuk (editor), Vasyl Borodin (deputy editor), Petro Zhur (editor collegiate), Yuri Ivakin (editor collegiate), Fedir Sarana (editor collegiate) (Shevchenko dictionary in two volumes)
 Yaroslav Kornilyev (engineer-constructor), Liudmila Nivina (architect), Zinoviy Podlesny (architect), Serhiy Zemyankin (architect) (living quarters Silvery in Lviv)
 Anatoliy Kos-Anatolsky (composer) (collection Vocal works)
 Oleksandr Lopukhov (pictures Spirit-strong, War, Moon sonata, Victory, Whirlwind of the October, Freedom-like)
 Yuri Mushketyk (novel Position)
 Mykhailo Stelmakh (novel Four fords)
 Stefan Turchak (conductor-director) (operas of M.Glinka Ivan Susanin, P.Chaykovsky Spade Queen, H.Maiboroda Milana in the State Academic Theater of Opera and Ballet of Ukraine in the name of Taras Shevchenko)

1981 

 Eduard Shorin (project director), Tamara Huselnykova (architect-restaurateur), Viktor Ivanov (engineer-constructor), Leonid Keranchuk (builder), Mykhailo Oziorny (artist), Viktor Semerniov (artist), Yuri Steshyn (artist), Liudmila Khlopinska (scientific consultant), Halyna Cherednychenko (scientific consultant) (museum of shipbuilding and fleet in Mykolaiv)
 Anatoliy Dimarov (novel-dialogue Pain and Anger)
  (concert programs of the last years)
 Vitaly Korotich (publicist books Cubic capacity of an egg, To see up-close and publicist performance in press media, radio, and television)
 Stepan Slipets (director), Mykhailo Lushpa (architect), Iryna Petrova (engineer-constructor), Andriy Chornodid (architect) (the Sumy Theater of Drama and Music Comedy in the name of M.Shchepkin)
 Ada Rogovtseva (performing roles of Ranevska (Chekhov's The Cherry Orchard), Lesia Ukrainka (Shcherbak's To Hope), and Nadia (Harayeva's Hostess) on a stege of the Kiev State Academic Russian Drama Theater in the name of Lesia Ukrainka)
 Vladislav Titov (stories In spite all odds, Kovyl, the steppe grass)
 The Cheksasy State Distinguished Ukrainian People's Chorus (concert programs of the last years)

1982 

 Platon Biletsky (books Ukrainian portrait painting of XVII-XVIII centuries, Ukrainian art in the second half of XVII-XVIII centuries, Ukrainian soviet art)
 Mykola Mashchenko (director), Serhiy Bondarchuk (performing the role of cardinal Montanelli), Andrei Kharitonov (performing the role of Ovod) (three series of television featured film Ovod (gadfly))
 Leonid Sandler (architect), Dmytro Sosnovy (architect), Vasyl Vilshuk (sculptor), Vasyl Lukashko (carver), Anton Ovchar (red-tree carpenter), Volodymyr Shevchuk (artist) (creation of the Music and Drama Theater in the name of Ivan Franko using the folklore motives (Ivano-Frankivsk))
 Viktor Terentyev (director), Andriy Honchar (performing the role of the author and the first secretary of the Party Oblast Committee), Oleksandr Kryvoshein (artistic director), Mykola Myroshnychenko (play author) (play Revival by the book of L.Brezhnev at the Odessa Oblast Russian Drama Theater in the name of A.Ivanov)
 Viktor Ikonnyk (artistic director and main conductor of the Kiev Chamber Chorus in the name of B.Liatoshynsky) (popularization of the Liatoshynsky chorus heritage and concert-performing role of the recent years)
 Anatoliy Moroz (novel Four on a way)
 Serhiy Shyshko (series of pictures The Kiev Suite)

1983 

 Anatoliy Antonov (architect), Mykhailo Butenko (ground director), Mykola Lutsenko (architect), Oleksandr Moliverov (architect), Anatoliy Pidvezko (architect), Heorhiy Ratushny (architect), (Vasyl Streltsov) (ground director) (building and improvement of the city of Verkhnodniprovsk, Dnipropetrovsk Oblast)

 Anatoliy Yavorsky (engineer, director of creative collective), Vadym Hlybchenko (technical architect), Iryna Ivanenko (critic), Yevhen Kulikov (sculptor), Lev Novikov (architect), Arkady Khabinsky (engineer), Vitaly Shkliar (architect) (restoration of Mariinskyi Palace in Kyiv)
 The State Distinguished Capella of bandurists of Ukraine (concert programs of recent years)
 Mykhailo Reznikovych (director), Viktor Dobrovolsky, Yuri Mazhuha, Anatoliy Pazenko, Anatoliy Reshetnikov, Mykola Rushkovsky, Oleksandra Smoliarova, Lida Yaremchuk (images of Soviet contemporaries in plays Limit of patience, University Department, Theme with variations at the Kiev State Academic Russian Drama Theater in the name of Lesia Ukrainka)
 Mykola Kolessa (composer)
 Hennadiy Kuznetsov (artist-designer), Yevhen Matveyev (grapher), Yuri Novikov (grapher), Mykhailo Shevchenko (grapher) (introduction of new principles in construction, design, and printing performance in works of classics of Marxism-Leninism and prominent figures of the communist and workers' movements (K.Marx Capital, The Civil War in France, And after all it spins!)
 Borys Oliynyk (collection of poetry Grey Swallow, In the mirror of a word, Duma of a city)
 Vasyl Svida (high relief In a family of one)
 Heorhiy Yakutovych (illustrations to books Tale of Bygone Years, The Tale of Igor's Campaign, M.Cheremshyn's Badges. Chichka. Thief is caught., and M.Prihara's Cossack Holota)

1984 

 Leonid Vysheslavsky (collection of poetry Near star)
 Mykola Vynhranovsky (collection of works for children Summer morning, Summer evening, Swallow by a window, Quite night)
 E.Fedorov (architect), Makar Vronsky (sculptor), Viktor Sukhenko (sculptor) (monument to T.Shevchenko in the city of Shevchenko, Mangyshlak Oblast (Kazakhstan).
 Valentyn Shtolko (architect, group leader), Alla Hrachiova (architect), Oleksandr Kabatsky (architect), Ihor Liubenko (architect), Volodymyr Ralchenko (architect), Volodymyr Sloboda (engineer-constructor) (hotel complex Hradetsky in Chernihiv.
 Vitaly Hubarenko (ballet Rocky host (second edition), opera Remember about me)
 Andriy Kushnyrenko (artistic director and main conductor of the distinguished Bukovina ensemble of song and dance) (concert programs 1979-1983)
 Oleksandr Syzonenko (novel-trilogy Steppe, There was autumn, Aim)
 Natalia Uzhviy (performing roles in plays of recent years on a stage of the Kiev State Academic Ukrainian Drama Theater in the name of I.Franko)
 Viktor Shatalin (series of pictures on historically-revolutionary, military-patriotic themes, works of contemporaries)
 Volodymyr Yavorivsky (story Eternal Kortelis)

1985 

 Valery Barulenkov (civil engineer), Anatoliy Haydamaka (artist), Vadym Hopkalo (architect), Vadym Hrechyna (architect), Volodymyr Kolomiyets (architect), Vitaliy Miahkov (artist), Leonid Filenko (architect) (architecture and artistic design of the Kiev filial of Central Lenin museum)
 Yevhen Horban (sculptor) (monument to the heroes of the Horlivka military uprising of 1905 in the city of Horlivka, Donetsk Oblast)
 Yevhen Hutsalo (story Sayyora and collection of stories Horses flew by)
 Roman Ivansky (artistic and music director), Volodymyr Didukh, Yevhen Prutkin, Valentyn Reus, Oleksandr Kharchenko (participants of vocal quartet Yavor) (concert programs 1982-1984)
 Boris Dobrodeyev and Nikolai Shishlin (script writers), Arnoldo Ibañez-Fernandez (film director), Volodymyr Kukorenchuk (cinematographer) (film "Troubled skies of Spain")
 Roman Ivanychuk (novels Water out of rock, Fourth dimension)
 Bohodar Kotorovych (violin) (concert programs 1982-1984)
 Dmytro Popenko (architect, group director), Leonid Los (architect), Iryna Pukhova (engineer-constructor) (complex of the Republican Scientifically  Methodical Center of mother and child health protection)
 Anatoliy Nasedkin (series of picturesque works of kolkhoz installation To kolkhoz, Bred of Revolution, Food Squad (Requisition), Earth)
 Mykola Rybalko (collection of poetry Non-setting star and new poetry in periodicals)
 Yuri Rymarenko (book of documentary-publicistic sketches and articles With whom and against whom)
 Vasyl Fashchenko (literary-critic works In depths of human existence, Characters and situations)
 Ivan Tsiupa (artistic-documentary book In the heart the voices ring and publicistic performance in press)

1986 

 Nadia Babenko, Hanna Bondarets, Domna Yefremova, Leonid Tovstukha, Mykola Trehubov, Valentyna Trehubova (artist-decorators of carpets and porcelain) (highly artistic use of folk traditions in the works of decor-applied arts)
 Mykhailo Belikov (director and script writer), Oleksiy Levchenko (artistic director), Vasyl Trushkovsky (camera) (featured films The night is short, How young we were)
 Klym Dominchen (symphony #4 (Great Patriotic))
 Volodymyr Zabashtansky (collection of poetry Smell of distance and newly published poetry in periodicals)
 Oksana Ivanenko (book Always in life)
 Ivan-Volodymyr Karpliuk (builder), Viktor Marchenko (architect), Ivan Oksentiuk (architect), Yosyp Parubochy (agronomist-landscaper), Vasyl Skuratovsky (architect), Andriy Shuliar (architect) (architecture in the village of Vuzlove, Radekhiv Raion, Lviv Oblast)
 Raisa Kyrychenko (singer) (concert performance 1983-1985)
 Valery Kovtun and Tatiana Tayakina (main parties in ballet of P.Chaykovsky Sleeping Beauty, M.Skorulsky Forest song at the State Academic Theater of Opera and Ballet of Ukraine in the name of T.Shevchenko and concert performance of recent years)
 Valentyn Sperkach (script writer and director), Anton Komarnytsky (script writer), Ihor Sabelnykov (script writer), Yuri Stakhovsky (camera) (documentary films Comandarms of Industry, Predominant Corps, Strategists of Science)
 Anton Komarnytsky and Ihor Sabeknykov (script writers), Valentyn Sperkach (film director), Yuri Stakhovsky (cinema), Ihor Poklad (composer) (documentaries "Army commanders of industry", "Commanding corps", "Strategy of science")

1987 

 Olha Basystiuk (singer) (concert programs of recent years)
 Anatoliy Borsiuk (director), Serhiy Diachenko (script writer), Oleksandr Frolov (camera) (educational film Vavilov's Star)
 Oleksiy Dmytrenko (artistic-documentary story Stork)
 Oleksiy Dubovy (scientific consultant), Leonid Kondratsky (architect), Mykola Sobchuk (architect), Oleksandra Stetsenko (engineer-constructor), Serhiy Fursenko (architect) (Regional Studies Oblast museum in Cherkasy)
 Fedir Zakharov (series of landscapes and still lifes Native my Ukraine)
 Lina Kostenko (historical novel in poetry Marusia Churay and collection of poetry Originality)
 Myroslav Skoryk (composer)

1988 

 Mykhailo Bernshein, Nadia Vyshnevska, Borys Derkach, Ihor Dzeverin, Oleksiy Zasenko, Oleksiy Mishanych, Fedir Pohrebennyk, Mykhailo Yatsenko (development of scientific principles, organization, and preparation of texts and commentary to collection of works of Ivan Franko in 50 volumes)
 Volodymyr Dakhno (director), Anatoliy Havrylov (camera), Eduard Kirych (artistic director) (series of "Cossacks" animated films about the Zaporizhian Cossacks)
 Nina Matviyenko (singer) (concert performance 1985-1987)
 Ivan Mykolaychuk (posthumously) (creation of versatile national images in films Dream, Shadows of Forgotten Ancestors, Weed, Commissars, White Bird with Black Mark, Vavilon-XX, Such late and such warm autumn)
 Maria Stefiuk (singer) (performing main parties in operas N.Rimsky-Korsakov Tsar's bride, G.Verdi Rigoletto and Traviata, H.Maiboroda Yaroslav the Wise and concert performance 1985-1987)
 Mykola Storozhenko (illustrations to the books of M.Kotsiubynsky Fata Morgana and Ivanko and Chuhayster, Panas Myrny Among steppes. Day on a pasture., I.Franko Sonnets, Ukrainian folk tales, Bulgarian folk tales)
 Valeriy Shevchuk (novel-triptych Three leaves behind the window)

1989 

 Ihor Kobrin (director), Yuri Bordakov (camera), Leonid Muzhuk (script writer), Khem Salhanyk (script writer) (cinema-trilogy Chornobyl: two colors of time)
 Ivan Honchar (several year long creative and research work of gathering and popularization of folklore)
 Lesia Dychko (oratorios And giveth it name Kiev (second edition), India Lakshmi, In Kiev dawns)
 Oleksandr Ivakhnenko (illustration to the works of T.Shevchenko)
 Anatoliy Kocherha (performance of parties in operas M.Mussorgsky Boris Godunov, G.Verdi Don Carlos, H.Maiboroda Milana)
 Nila Kriukova (reader) (concert programs 1986-1988)
 People's Self-performing Chorus capella Dudaryk (artistic director M.Katsal) (concert programs of recent years)
 Hryhor Tiutiunnyk (posthumously) (Works in two volumes)

1990s

1990 

 Dmytro Bilous (collection of poetry Cranberry Miracle)
 Borys Voznytsky (several years long work for preservation, research, and popularization of culture heritage)
 State Kuban Cossack Choir (artistic director V.Zakharchenko) (outstanding work for gathering and research of the Ukrainian folk songs and dances their propaganda in concert performance in our country and abroad)
 Liubov Ilchenko (artist), Vasyl Kononenko (artist), Leonid Makhnovets (author of translation, foreword, and notes), Volodymyr Yurchyshyn (artist) (preparation and release the edition of Russian Cronicles)
 Ivan Kozlovsky (singer) (development and enrichment of the Ukrainian music culture and concert performance of recent years)
 Stepan Pushyk (books Guard-mountain, Halych gate)

1991 

 Ivan Bilyk (historical work Golden Ra)
 Ivan Dziuba (series of publicist performances For that is not just a language, sounds, articles Ukraine and world, Whether we realize national culture as value)
 Sergei Parajanov (director) (posthumously), Larisa Kadochnikova (role performer), Yuri Ilyenko (camera), Heorhiy Yakutovych (artist) (featured film Shadows of Forgotten Ancestors)
 Rollan Serhiyenko (director), Oleksandr Koval (camera), Volodymyr Kostenko (script writer) (posthumously), Mykola Shudrya (script writer) (documentary films Open yourself, Taras, Before the icon)
 Yuliy Meitus (series of romances on verses of the Soviet poets and chorus series on the poetry of A.Tvardovsky)
 Vasyl Stus (posthumously) (collection of poetry Road of pain)

1992 

 Borys Antonenko-Davydovych (collection of poetry Death. Siberian short stories. The overestimated evaluations.)
 Ivan Bahriany (posthumously) (novels Garden Hefsimansky, Tiger-hunters)
 Viktor Hutsal (artistic director of the State Orchestra of the Ukrainian folk instruments) (concert programs 1988-1991)
 Volodymyr Drozd (epic novel Foliage of the Earth)
 Mykola Zhulinsky (book From oblivion - into immortality)
 Capella of badurists in the name of T.Shevchenko (United States) (artistic directors H.Kytasty, V.Kolesnyk) (popularization of the Ukrainian musical heritage)
 Stepan Kolesnyk (publicist story The robbed villages and other works about the fate of the Ukrainian village life)
 Oleksandr Kostyn (opera-fairy tale Golden-horned deer, ballet Mermaid)
 Roman Lubkivsky (collection of poetry Sight of eternity)
 Mykola Maksymenko (series of landscapes Ukraine mine)
 Taras Melnychuk (collection of poetry Prince of dew)
 Pavlo Movchan (collection of poetry Continent, Encirclement)
 Feodosy Rohovy (novel Praznyk ostanioho mlyva)
 Hryhory Synytsia (revival of the Ukrainian colorful school of monumental painting and works of recent years)
 Chorus in the name of O.Koshytsia (Canada) (artistic director V.Klymkiv) (popularization of the Ukrainian chorus art)

1993 

 Myroslav Vantukh (artistic director of the State Academic ensemble of dance of Ukraine in the name of P.Virsky) (staging dance compositions In peace and agreement, Carpathians, Young years, Ukrainian dance with tambourines)
 Yarema Hoyan (story Secret of Lesyk's violin)
 Pavlo Hromovenko (reader) (concert program It is not indifferent to me 1989-1992)
 Feodosy Humeniuk (series of portrait of historical accuracy P.Sahaydachny, P.Polubotko, I.Mazepa, Marusia Chubay, Bayda Vyshnevetsky, S.Nalyvayko, I.Honta, M.Zalizniak)
 Anatoliy Karas (script writer and director), Viktor Shkurin (script writer and director), Viktor Kripchenko (main camera) (documentary cinema-dialogue July Thunder)
 Lida Kovalenko and Volodymyr Maniak (posthumously) (people's book-memorial 33rd: famine)
 Volodymyr Kolomiyets (collection of poems Zolotosyn-Golden-blue)
 Danylo Lider (artist-stenographer), Natalia Lototska (performer of main role), Bohdan Stupka (performer of main role) (play Tevye-Tevel of Sholem Aleichem in Kiev State Academic Ukrainian Drama Theater of Ivan Franko)
 Hryhoriy Lohvin (monograph Out of depths. Engravings of the Ukrainian old-pressmen of XVI-XVIII centuries. and series of scientific works regarding the Ukrainian art and architecture)
 Vasyl Lopata (illustrations to Kobzar)
 Dmytro Mishchenko (collection of works Hunt for Firebird, Personally responsible)
 Kira Muratova (outstanding contribution to the Ukrainian and World cinema art)
 Anatoliy Palamarenko (reciter) (concert programs of recent years)
 Mykola Rudenko (novel Orlov balka, collection Poems)
 Stepan Sapeliak (collection of poems Long ragged cry)
 Leonid Talalay (collection of poems Selected)
 Svitlana Fominykh (artistic director and conductor of a female academic chorus (Mykolaiv)) (concert programs of recent years and propagation of the modern Ukrainian chorus music)
 Leopold Yashchenko (artistic director of the folkloric-ethnographic chorus Homyn) (active efforts for conservation, revival, and popularization of the Ukrainian National Art)

1994 

 Andriy Antonyuk for series of paintings in last years: "Metropolitan Illarion"", "Feofan Prokopovych", "In the casemate (T.Shevchenko)",  "Teacher, who are we?", "Worship of water and earth", "Bohopolska Madonna", "Conversation in the Universe", "A trumpet sound. Caution"
 Olena Apanovych for the book "Hetmans of Ukraine and Kosh Otamans of Zaporizhian Host"
 Leonid Bolshakov for documentary trilogy "Years of slavery (Story about Taras)"
 Yuri Herts for series of paintings "Colorful Verkhovyna"
 Vasyl Holoborodko for collection of poetry "Icarus on wings of Fabaceae", "Viburnum for Christmas"
 Viktor Zaretsky for painting of last years: "Soldieress", "Summer", "Wood (Origins of Art)", "Oi, kum do kumy zalytsyavsya", "Spring troubles"
 Volodymyr Ivasyuk (posthumously) for an outstanding contribution in the development of Ukrainian national musical art
 Robert Conquest for book The Harvest of Sorrow
 Oleksandr Lupyi for roman "Fall of the ancient capital", novel "Hetman's bulawa"
 Roman Rakhmanny for the three volume collection "Ukraine of the nuclear age"
 Nadia Svitlychna for an active journalist and publishing activities of last years
 Ivan Svitlychny for a collection of poetry, poetic translations, and literary-critical articles "Heart for bullets and rhymes"
 Ivan Chendei for book "Viburnum under snow", novel "Ivan"

1995 

  for album "Ukrainian folk art of the 13th-20th centuries"
 Mykola Bednyak (Canada) for series of historical paintings and portraits: "Prince Danylo of Halych", "Hetman Ivan Mazepa", "Dovbush", "Battle neat Kruty", a cycle of iconic compositions
 State Capella of Ukraine "" (artistic director and chief conductor M.Kulyk) for the concert programs of 1992-94
 Ivan-Valentyn Zadorozhny (posthumously) for series of works 1964-88
 Afanasi Zalyvakha for the compositions of last years: "20th century", "Peace-carriers", "Ukrainian Madonna", "Portrait of Vasyl Stus", "Portrait of Shevchenko", "Cossack is carried", "The beginning"
 Vasyl Zakharchenko for roman "Profitable people"
 Hryhori Kochur for a book of translations "Second echo"
 Yevhen Sverstyuk for book "Prodigal sons of Ukraine"
 Vasyl Symonenko (posthumously) for a collection of poetry and prose "Swans of motherhood", "I live in your name", "My people will always be"
 Valentyn Sylvestrov for the Symphony No.5, String quartet No.1, cantata to words by Shevchenko for chorus and Capella
 Roman Fedoriv for roman "Jerusalem on the hills"
 Mykola Shopsha for performance of Ivan Karas opera roles ("Zapozhets za Dunayem" of S.Hulak-Artemovsky), Zakhar Berkut ("Golden hoop" of B.Lyatoshynsky), Boris Godunov ("Boris Godunov" of M.Mussorgsky), and other concert programs of 1992-94

1996 

 Vira Ageyeva,  for a textbook "History of Ukrainian literature of 20th century" in two books
 Volodymyr Bazilevsky for collection of poetry "Vertep"
 Oleh Biyma (film director), Oleksiy Bohdanovych (actor), Volodymyr Hronsky (composer), Zinaida Dehtyaryova (actress), Oleksiy Zotsenko (camera), Olha Sumska (actress), Anatoliy Khostikoyev (actor) for series of featured films for television "Trap", "Crime with many unknowns"
 Virko Balei (United States), a conductor and composer, for outstanding contribution in development of Ukrainian Music Art and its propaganda in the world
 Iryna Zhylenko for collection of poetry "Party in the old vinarne"
 Valentyn Znoba for creation of sculpture compositions on the theme of the Great Patriotic War (monuments of Glory in Kherson, Khmelnytskyi, at Bukrin platzdarm, a monument in Brovary)
 Raisa Ivanchenko for tetralogy about the Kievan Rus: "Treason or how to become a master", "Wreath of Perun", "Golden Stirrups", "Poison for the princess"
 Viktor Minyailo for roman "Eternal Ivan"
 Danaylo Narbut for series of portraits "Hetmans of Ukraine" and paintings "Election of Kosh Otaman", "Doom", "Protection of the Virgin"
 Taras Petrynenko for remarkable achievement in development of a modern Ukrainian pop song, concert-performing activity of last years
 Vyacheslav Chornovil for collections "Justice or recurrence of terror", "Woe from Wit", a book "Chrnicles of camp days", journalistic works in newspapers and magazines of Ukraine and worlds
 Bohdan-Yuri Yanivsky for cycle of musical compositions in a big form for children: opera "The frog princess", musicale "Mykyta the Fox", "Ring of temptation", "Tom Soyer"
 Nazar Yaremchuk (posthumously), singer, for concert work 1973-95

1997 

 Ivan Marchuk, for series of paintings "Shevchenkiana", "Voice of my soul"
 Lyudmyla Semykina, "High Castle"
 Petro Skunts, for collection of poetry "Ask yourself"
 Anatoliy Solovianenko, for concert programs 1993-96
 Oleksandr Ulianenko, for novel "Stalinka"

1998 

 , for novel "Storonets"
 Mykhailo Didyk, for performing of the main party of the Duke in opera "Rigoletto" G.Verdi (National Opera of Ukraine)
 Olha Nahorna, for performing of the main party of Gilda in opera "Rigoletto" G.Verdi (National Opera of Ukraine)
 Mykola Dremlyuha, for symphony #3 "To the memory of the Holodomor victims of 1932-33 in Ukraine"
 Ivan Lytovchenko (posthumously), for tapestry-triptych "Origins of Slavic writing" (passed to Maria Lytovchenko)
 Volodymyr Pasivenko, Volodymyr Pryadka, for monumental-decorative panneau "Pain of earth" for the Vernadsky National Library of Ukraine
 Yevhen Savchuk, artistic director and main conductor of the National Academic Capella of Ukraine "DUMKA", for concert programs of the Ukrainian choir music 1992-97
 Tetyana Yablonska, for series of scenic works 1993-97

1999 

 Ivan Bilyk, Mykhailo Kitrysh, Vasyl Omelyanenko, for series of works with  ceramics
 Valeriy Buimister (singer), for concert programs 1993-1998: "Shevchenkiana", "Ukrainian composers of present", "Italian music", "German music"
 Hanna Havrylets (composer), for the musical stage show "Gold stone will sow"
 Dmytro Kremin, for collection of poetry "Pectoral"
 Bohdan Mazur (sculptor), for the monument to Sergei Paradjanov in Kyiv and "Angel of grief" in Khmelnytsky
 Mykola Merzlykin (film director), Ihor Shcherbakov (composer), for play "Trap for a witch" in Kyiv State Music Theater for children and youth
 Dmytro Nalyvaiko, for book "With eyes of the West. Reception of Ukraine in Western Europe in 11th-18th centuries"
 Volodymyr Patyk, for series of works "Land of Shevchenko" and works of recent years

2000s

2000 

 Ivan Hnatyuk, for book "Stezhky-dorozhky"
 Vilen Kalyuta (posthumously) (cameraman), for camera works of recent years
 Alemdar Karamanov, for concert #2 for piano with orchestra "Ave Maria" and symphony #23 "Az Iisus"
 Borys Necherda (posthumously), for collection of poetry "The last book"
 Marfa Tymchenko, for series of works of folk decorative scenic painting
 Volodymyr Chepelyk (sculptor), for the monument to Mykhailo Hrushevsky in Kyiv
 Anatoliy Shekera (choreograph), for ballet plays of recent years
 Andriy Shkurhan (singer), for concert programs 1995-99

2001 

 Volodymyr Hryshko, for vocal parties in opera plays
 Roman Maiboroda, for vocal parties in opera plays
 Yevhen Pashkovsky, for novel "Daily baton"
 Myroslav Popovych, for book "Outline of the history of Ukraine culture"

2002 

 Serhiy Bilokin, for scientific-nonfiction book "Mass terror as the way of state administration in USSR"
 Andriy Bokotei, for dimensional compositions out of glass
 Arkadiy Mikulsky (film director), Leonid Cherevatenko (screenwriter), for documentary movie trilogy "I am a stone from a sling of God"
 Ihor Rymaruk, for book of poetry "Maiden Resentment"

2003 

 Vasyl Herasymyuk, for book of poetry "Poet in air"
 Maria Levytska (painter-scenographer), for scenographic works of recent years
 Vyacheslav Medved, for novel "Blood in the straw"
 Vyacheslav Palkin (conductor), for concert programs 1998-2002

2004 

 Yuri Barabash, for the monograph "If I forget you, Jerusalem... Gogol and Shevchenko"
 Serhiy Bukovsky (movie director), for the documentary TV-series "War. Ukrainian account"
 Vasyl Slapchuk, for books of poetry "Against the stream of grass", "Branch on the walking stick of wanderer"
 Lyudmyla Yurchenko, for a vocal performance in opera spectacles
 Serhiy Yakutovych, for a cycle of graphical artistry in last years

2005 

  (author arrangement),  (sculpture artist), Ibrahim-Girei Nagayev (chief architect), Zarema Nagayeva (architect), Fefza Yakubov (concept author), for sculpture-complex "Renaissance" (Simferopol)
 Mykola Vorobiov, for the book of poetry "Servant of Pionium"
 Viktor Kaminsky, for the concert #2 "Christmas", the symphony-cantanta "Ukraine. The Crusade.", the operettas "Going, calling, begging" and "Akathist to the Blessed Virgin Mary"
 Mykhailyna Kotsyubynska, for the book "My horizons" 2 volumes
 Serhiy Krymsky, for the books "Philosophy as the way of humanity and hope" and "Requests of philosophical senses"
 Yuri Lanyuk, for the musical creations "Palimpsests" and "Music from the Book of Secret Spaces, and Elegy for Bird of Radiance" 
 Maria Matios, for the novel "Sweet Darusya"
 Volodymyr Mykyta, for series of works "Native Land"
 Mykhailo Slaboshpytsky, for the autobiographical novel "Poet out of hell"

2006 

 Yevhen Beznysok, for series of illustrations to the works of Ivan Franko
 Hryhoriy Huseinov, for the artistic documentary life story in 9 volumes "Lord's seed"
 Ihor Kachurovsky, for the book "Radiant silvetkas"
 Anatoli Kychynsky, for the books of poetry "Flying over November" and "Dance of Fire"
 Volodymyr Kuchynsky (play director), Oleh Stefanov, Natalya Polovynka, Andriy Vodychev (role performers), for plays by the works of Plato, Hryhoriy Skovoroda, Vasyl Stus in the Lviv Academic Youth Theater of Les Kurbas
 Valeri Matyukhin (artistic director and main conductor of the National vocalist ensemble "Kievan Camerata"), for the musical-artistic project "Music from the Ancient Times to the Modern" 
 Volodymyr Nedyak, for the illustrated history of the Ukrainian Cossacks "Ukraine, the Cossack State"
 Vasyl Nechepa (kobzar), for concert program "In the rumble and lament of banduras"
 Anatoliy Pogrebnoy, for the publicistic trilogy "In the vicious circle of ages", "If we are, then where?", "Call of the strong rank"
 Zoya Chehusova, for the album-catalog "Decorative Arts of Ukraine at the end of the 20th century. 200 names"

2007 

 Mykola Hobdych (artistic director of the Academic Chamber Choir "Kyiv"), for the artistic program "Thousand years of the Ukrainian spiritual music"
 Eustachy Lapski (Poland), for the books of poetry "Looking for oneself" and "On the both sides of the truth"
 Mykhailo Melnyk (director and actor), for the play "The sin" in the Dnipropetrovsk Ukrainian Theater of One Actor "Kryk"
 Ivan Ostafiychuk, for the cycles of artistic works "My Ukraine", "Journey to Baturyn", "Boykos' saga"
 Borys Plaksiy, for the cycles of picturesque works "Creators of Independence", "The agony of evil"
 Dmytro Stus, for the book "Vasyl Stus: life as art" 
 Raymond Turkoniak (USA), for the translation of the Ostroh Bible into the modern Ukrainian language
 Taras Fedyuk, for the book of poetry "Faces of desert"
 Andriy Chebykin, for the cycle of artistic works "Crimean motives", "Female images", "Withered foliage"

2008 

 Lyubov Holota, for the novel "Episodic memory"
 Alexander Dzekun (Russia, play director), Volodymyr Petriv (role performer), for the play "Berestechko" of the Rivne Academic Musical-Drama Theater
 Hennadiy Lyashenko, for the cantantas "The mystery of silence" and "Stained glass and sceneries" for choir and capella on the poetry of Taras Shevchenko and Bohdan-Ihor Antonych
 Vitali Malakhov (play director), Bohdan Benyuk, Nataliya Sumska (role performers), for the play "Of mice and people" of theatrical company Benyuk and Khostikoyev
 Petro Perebyinis, for the collection of poetry "The wheat clocks"
 Vira Selyanska (Brazil), for the books "The Seventh Seal", "The Romen-herb" and translation of works of the Ukrainian literature into the Portuguese language 
 Vasyl Sydak, for the series of wooden sculptures
 Mykhailo Tkachuk (movie director), for the documentary series "The mystery of the Norilsk Uprising"
 Valeri Franchuk, for the cycle of picturesque works "The swung of bells of the memory", commemorated to the victims of Holodomor
 Volodymyr Yakymets, Yaroslav Nudyk, Bohdan Bohach, Andriy Kapral, Andriy Shavalya, Roman Turyanyn (performers of the vocal group "Picardian trio"), for the concert programs (2003-2006)

2009 

 Pavlo Hirnyk, for the book of poetry "The dawn"
 Viktor Hontarov, for series of canvases "My Gogol" and cycle of picturesque works
 Larysa Kadyrova, for gallery of female images in mono-plays and contribution in development of the Ukrainian theatrical arts
 Volodymyr Melnychenko, for the document-publicist books "Taras Shevchenko. My stay in Moscow.", "In honor of our exalted Ukraine (Taras Shevchenko and Osip Bodyansky)"
 Viktor Nakonechnyi, for series of paintings "My shiny land"

2010s

2010 

  (publicist), for the documental-artistic trilogy "Brothers of thunder", "Brothers of fire", and "Brothers of spaces"
 Mykola Babak (director of project and artistic arrangement), Oleksandr Naidyon (script author), for the monograph "National icon of the Mid-Dnieper region in the 18-20th centuries in context of peasant cultural field"
 Stepan Hanzha (master of folk artistry), for the artistic series of carpets
 Dmytro Ivanov (poet), for the book of poetry "Village in a torn wreath"
 Viktor Kovtun (artist), for the cycle of picturesque works "My land - Sloboda Ukraine"
 Bohdan Kozak (performer), for the concert performance of poetic compositions "The Gospel of Taras" and "Thoughts" based on the works of Taras Shevchenko
 Levko Kolodub (composer), for the symphony #9 "Sensilis moderno" ("Newest impressions"), the symphony #10 "Based on sketches of the young age", the symphony #11 "New banks"
 Kost Lavro (artist), for illustrations to the works of classics of Patriotic literature and monumental paintings the themes of the Ukrainian folk tales in the Kiev State Academic Puppet Theater
 Halyna Pahutyak (writer), for the book of prose "Servant out of Dobromyl"
 Oksana Pakhlevska (writer), for the book of journalism "Ave, Europa!"

2011 

 Roman Horak, Mykola-Yaroslav Hnativ (literary critics), for the book "Ivan Franko"
 Mykola Dedyura (musical director and conductor), Anatoli Solovianenko (stage director), Serhiy Mahera (party performance of Orovezo), Svitlana Kramareva (party performance of Norma), for the opera play "Norma" of Vincenzo Bellini in the National Academic Theater of Opera and Ballet of Ukraine of Taras Shevchenko
 Lydia Zabylyasta (singer), for party performance of Ingigerd, Turandot, and Amelia the opera plays "Yaroslav the Wise" of Heorhiy Maiboroda, "Turandot" of Giacomo Puccini, and "Un ballo in maschera" of Giuseppe Verdi on the stage of the National Opera of Ukraine and the concert programs of the Ukrainian folk songs and romances
 Vasyl Shklyar (writer), for the book "Black Raven" (first refused, but later accepted)

2012 

 Petro Midyanka (poet), for the collection of poetry "Luitro into sky" (2010)
 Volodymyr Rutkivsky (prose writer), for the historical trilogy for children "Djury" (2007–10) ("Djury of Cossack Shvaika", "Djury the Characters", "Djury and the submarine")
 Tetyana Kara-Vasylieva (art critic), for the book "History of the Ukrainian embroidery" (2008)
 Viktor Stepurko (composer), for the psalm-melody "Monologues of ages" for a mixed choir and solo instruments (in seven parts by canonical texts)
 Anatoli Kryvolap (artist), for the cycle out of 50 works "The Ukrainian motif"

2013 
 Dmytro Bohomazov (theatre director) for the plays "Hamlet" by W. Shakespeare of the Odessa Academic Ukrainian Music and Drama Theater, "Guests will come at midnight" by A. Miller of the Kyiv Academic Drama and Comedy Theater on the left bank of the Dnieper and "Shchurolov" by O. Green of the Kyiv Theater "Free Stage»
 Leonid Kovaloenko (poet) for the book of poems "The Sign of the Broken Yoke"
 Petro Pechorny (artist) for a series of ceramic plates based on the works of Taras Shevchenko

References 

Ukraine-related lists